The 1927 Michigan State Normal Normalites football team was an American football team that represented Michigan State Normal School (later renamed Eastern Michigan University) during the 1927 college football season. In their sixth season under head coach Elton Rynearson, the Normalites compiled a perfect 8–0 record, won the Michigan Collegiate Conference championship, shut out six of eight opponents, and outscored all opponents by a combined total of 186 to 13. The team played its home games at Normal Field on the school's campus in Ypsilanti, Michigan.

Schedule

References

Michigan State Normal
Eastern Michigan Eagles football seasons
Michigan Collegiate Conference football champion seasons
College football undefeated seasons
Michigan State Normal Normalites football